New Dress or The New Dress may refer to:

"New Dress" (Depeche Mode song), a song by Depeche Mode from their 1986 album Black Celebration
"New Dress" (Cheryl Lynn song), a 1986 single by Cheryl Lynn later released on her 1987 album Start Over
The New Dress, a 1911 American short silent film by D. W. Griffith
The New Dress (1907 film), a 1907 American short silent film by Lewin Fitzhamon
The New Dress (band), an American folk rock band active 2007-2010